Twelfth & Pingree, is a live album by baritone saxophonist Pepper Adams which was recorded in Munich in 1975 and originally released on the Enja label.

Track listing 
All compositions by Pepper Adams except where noted.

 "Twelfth & Pingree" – 9:45
 "A Child Is Born" (Thad Jones) – 8:26
 "Well, You Needn't" (Thelonious Monk) – 9:27
 "Bossa Nouveau" – 9:36

Personnel 
Pepper Adams – baritone saxophone
Walter Norris – piano
George Mraz – bass
Makaya Ntshoko – drums

References 

Pepper Adams live albums
1976 live albums
Enja Records live albums